The World Group was the highest level of Fed Cup competition in 2017.

Draw

Quarterfinals

Czech Republic vs. Spain

United States vs. Germany

Belarus vs. Netherlands

Switzerland vs. France

Semifinals

United States vs. Czech Republic

Belarus vs. Switzerland

Final

Belarus vs. United States

References 

World Group